Teddy Da Costa (born 17 February 1986) is a French professional ice hockey player. He is currently a free agent having last played for Brûleurs de Loups in the Ligue Magnus. Da Costa has represented France at two junior men's world championships and seven senior men's world championships.

Personal
A native of Melun, France, Da Costa is the son of a Portuguese–French father and Polish mother.

Playing career
Da Costa first played professionally in 2004–04 for the Rapaces de Gap, where he played with his brother Gabriel. He scored eight goals and three assists in 19 games. The following season, he signed with KH Zagłębie Sosnowiec in Poland, where he would play five seasons. Da Costa joined Rouen for the 2010–11 season. Da Costa returned to Poland to play with GKS Tychy for two seasons. In 2013, he signed with Hokki of the Mestis league in Finland. For the 2014–2015 season he was signed by Tappara, playing in the Finnish Elite League, Liiga.

International
Internationally, Da Costa has played on Frances' national Under-20 ice hockey team in 2005 and 2006. He has played for the France national men's team in 2011, 2012 and 2013.

Da Costa was named to the France men's national ice hockey team for competition at the 2014 IIHF World Championship.

References

External links
 

1986 births
Brûleurs de Loups players
Dragons de Rouen players
French ice hockey forwards
French people of Polish descent
French people of Portuguese descent
GKS Tychy (ice hockey) players
Hokki players
MKS Cracovia (ice hockey) players
Lahti Pelicans players
Lempäälän Kisa players
Living people
Orli Znojmo players
Peliitat Heinola players
Rapaces de Gap players
Sportspeople from Melun
Tappara players
Vaasan Sport players
KH Zagłębie Sosnowiec players
French expatriate sportspeople in Poland
French expatriate sportspeople in the Czech Republic
French expatriate sportspeople in Finland
Expatriate ice hockey players in the  Czech Republic
Expatriate ice hockey players in Finland
Expatriate ice hockey players in Poland
French expatriate ice hockey people